The 1989 Girabola was the 11th season of top-tier football competition in Angola. Atlético Petróleos de Luanda were the defending champions.

The league comprised 14 teams, none of which were relegated.

Petro de Luanda were crowned champions, winning their 6th title, and fourth in a row, while there were no relegations.

André of Desportivo da Cuca finished as the top scorer with 18 goals.

Changes from the 1989 season
Relegated: Desportivo de Benguela, Dínamos do Kwanza Sul, Fabril do Uíge, Inter do Namibe
Promoted: Desportivo da Cuca, Desportivo da EKA, Sassamba da Lunda Sul, Sporting de Benguela

League table

Results

Season statistics

Top scorer
 André

Champions

External links
Federação Angolana de Futebol

Angola
Angola
Girabola seasons